Safeyoka, or Ampale, is an Angan language of Papua New Guinea. Other names of this language include Ambari, Ampeeli, Ampeeli-Wojokeso, and Ampele. According to a 1980 census, there were around 2,390 native speakers. Commonly known as Ampale, the dialect is called Wojokeso. Speakers of Ampale range from the Waffa River to the Banir River, which is located in the northern part of Papua New Guinea. The Wojokeso dialect is spoken by people who live in five villages where multiple districts, the Kaiapit, Mumeng and Menyama come together in the Morobe Province.

Grammar

Subject Personal Pronouns 
In the term stem of Ampale outlines, the object person affixes are included in them. Class 2 verb roots, /put/ and /kill/, they occur immediately following the root. Other verb roots immediately come before the root. Object person affixes include:

Sentence Structure 
The Ampale language classifies with the Wojokeso dialect of the Angan language stock. According to B.A Hooley and K.A. McElhanon, the language is referred to as the "Languages of the Morobe District - New Guinea". The sentence types of the Wojokeso are pattern types. On non-final verbs, the Wojokeso links clauses together by the means of affixes or clitics.

Simple 
The simple sentence formula is "+ Base: General Clause/Elliptical Clause + Terminal: Final Intonation." The sentence is explained by a single base and final intonation. In other words, the single base is expounded by the general clause. Single base moods include: Indicative, Interrogative, Dubitative, Information interrogative, Avolitional, and Exclamatory.

Series 
The series sentence indicates multiple actions a person does. There is no grammatical distinction between temporal succession and temporal overlap. Usually used to explain actions which are performed by a dual or plural subject. However, actions with this partial change in subject may also be classified as a sequence sentence.

Sequence 
The sequence sentence indicates an order of actions being completed by a subject, where base 1 differs from base 2. The action of the first base is usually completed before the action of the second base even begins. The deep structure of this sentence type is that it is purely based on succession.

Example:

"Sɨkuno nomeHONƗNGKI sukwo'miyomo hofantiso toho nelofAHONƗNGKI"

This translates into "Darkness came and night mosquitoes bit us". This expresses temporal succession.

Tense

Phonology

Consonants 
The Wojokeso has fifteen simple and six complex consonant phonemes. The points of articulation include bilabial, alveolar, alveopalatal and velar. The bilabial fricative phoneme is /p/, alveolar resonant phoneme /I/, alveopalatal stop phoneme /j/ and velar fricative phoneme /h/.

Vowels 
The Wojokeso contains five vowel phonemes, /i, u, e, ʌ, a/. However, there was said to be seven vowels of the Wojokeso /i, e, æ, ɨ, ʌ, a, u/ although there were no clear cut contrasts.

Vowel Clusters 
When two vowels occur contiguously, they are considered separate segments. Non-suspect sequences such as /ea/, /ae/, occur and sequences /ai/, /ia/ and /ʌu/, /uʌ/. The syllabic and pitch accent of these vowels consider the syllables to be separate. In the words of /hasamjʌhwʌ/ ~ /hasaʔemjʌhwʌ/ 'dragonfly'. /ʔ/ is optional between two vowels.

References

Languages of Morobe Province
Angan languages